Gökçesu is a town (belde) in the Mengen District, Bolu Province, Turkey. Its population is 1,842 (2021). It is situated in the forest between two mountain ranges. Up to 73 BC, the area around the town was a part of Bithynia Kingdom. Then it became a part of the Roman and the Byzantine Empires. In 1359 it was incorporated into the Ottoman Empire. In 1991 it was declared a seat of township.

References

Populated places in Bolu Province
Towns in Turkey
Mengen District